Georgi Beslanovich Botsiyev (born 2 September 1976) is a Russian professional football coach and a former player.

Club career
He made his debut in the Russian Premier League in 1994 for FC Spartak Vladikavkaz.

Honours
 Russian Premier League champion: 1995.
 Russian Premier League runner-up: 1996.

References

1976 births
Sportspeople from Vladikavkaz
Living people
Russian footballers
Russia under-21 international footballers
Association football midfielders
FC Spartak Vladikavkaz players
FC Torpedo Moscow players
PFC Spartak Nalchik players
FC Dynamo Stavropol players
FC Volgar Astrakhan players
Russian Premier League players
Russian football managers